Zibika is a village in the Municipality of Šmarje pri Jelšah in eastern Slovenia. The area is part of the traditional region of Styria. The municipality is now included in the Savinja Statistical Region.

The local parish church is dedicated to Saint Bartholomew and belongs to the Roman Catholic Diocese of Celje. It dates to the 14th century but was expanded and rebuilt over the centuries.

References

External links
Zibika at Geopedia

Populated places in the Municipality of Šmarje pri Jelšah